The Oldham, Ashton and Guide Bridge Junction Railway (OA&GB) was a British railway company, which opened in 1861, connecting Oldham, Ashton and Guide Bridge. The company survived until it was nationalised in 1948.

Early days
In 1847 the Manchester, Sheffield and Lincolnshire Railway (MS&LR) had submitted a scheme to Parliament to build a line from Guide Bridge to Oldham. The Bill was rejected in favour of a scheme, presented in the same parliamentary session, for a small network of lines called the Oldham Alliance Railway, a joint venture between the Manchester and Leeds Railway (M&LR) and two companies who had line proposals that had not yet been sanctioned. Its Act stated that once half the required capital had been raised by the new companies they would be amalgamated with the M&LR, the required funds were not found and the venture was abandoned in 1850.

In 1856, a deputation, including the Mayors of Oldham (John Platt) and Ashton-under-Lyne (Nathaniel Buckley), approached the MS&LR to support a line from Guide Bridge which would connect to the Lancashire and Yorkshire Railway (L&YR) and the London and North Western Railway (LNWR) at Oldham.

Initially, the MS&LR had hoped that the other railways would support the scheme but they showed little interest, and the MS&LR board members had to put up the remaining finance privately. Once incorporated as the Oldham, Ashton-under-Lyne and Guide Bridge Junction Railway in 1857, the L&YR took an interest, but the MS&LR, wishing the line to be a three way venture, prevailed upon the LNWR to join in. Not wishing to be associated with the LNWR the L&YR withdrew and when it opened the line was operated jointly by the LNWR and MS&LR.

Construction
The line was laid out by John George Blackburne who also supervised the construction, he later became the lines engineer. Over 800 men were employed in constructing the line which was let in two contracts, James Taylor of Dukinfield built the northern section from Ashton to Oldham and Mr Knight the southern section. The section between Guide Bridge and the L&YR near Ashton was completed in March 1860. Wet weather had hampered further work, for which a long cutting and an embankment, plus the 12-arch Park Bridge Viaduct was needed. By 1 June 1861 the line had been completed apart from the viaduct,  the final stretch into Oldham station, Oldham station itself and the connection to the LNWR, it was reported that the railway would soon be open.

Opening, early management and services
The Oldham, Ashton and Guide Bridge Junction Railway Company organised the building of the railway from incorporation in 1857, saw the lines completion in 1861 and the start of services, albeit using stock provided by the MS&LR. The companies majority shareholders were the MS&LR and the LNWR and under the terms of its original Act a further Act was enabled leasing the railway to its two major shareholders, this Act was promulgated and the OA&GB became a joint line from 30 June 1862. Each company appointed three out of the nine directors with the other three being local supporters including Platt and Buckley as Chairman and Deputy Chairman respectively.

The line opened on 26 August 1861, with a celebration of the opening taking place on Wednesday 31 August 1861 when a special train carrying 200 guests ran from  through Guide Bridge to Clegg Street, Oldham.

In September 1861 the OA&GB operated around twelve round trips between Oldham Clegg Street and Manchester London Road, most went via Guide Bridge where they would be required to reverse direction about half the services didn't call at Park Bridge and Ashton Moss only had two services in each direction. The engines and carriages were provided by the MS&LR.

Goods traffic began operating on the line from 1 February 1863. According to Fraser (1963) there was no urgency to start up goods traffic as the MS&LR owned the Ashton Canal which connected the same towns with Manchester, in effect the OA&GB was competing with one of its owners.

Until 1872 the MS&LR operated the trains, the LNWR took over some services in 1869-1870 and after 1873 coaches were supplied jointly.

Description of the line
Most services ran to and from the LNWR  station where a bay platform was constructed in the 1860s to accommodate them, this platform was rented by the OA&GB.

OA&GB stations were:
,
,
, and
 which closed in 1862.

The line ended by splitting at Canal Junction and curving to the left and right to form a triangular junction with the MS&LR. The left fork then traversed  of MS&LR track from Stockport Junction (later Guide Bridge Junction) into MS&LR  station.

The GCR, as the MS&LR had now become, installed a south to west curve link just north of Ashton Moss, creating a triangular junction with the L&YR, it opened on 18 December 1911.

The canal curve between Canal Junction and Audenshaw Junction was used infrequently and was removed as early as 1938.

Whilst most of the former OA&GB line is closed the former GCR line through Guide Bridge and the former L&YR line through Ashton remain open.

Later management and closure
The Manchester, Sheffield and Lincolnshire Railway became the Great Central Railway (GCR) on 1 August 1897, as part of the legal tidying up as a consequence of the change, the Great Central & London & North Western Joint Committee was set up in 1905, to administer various undertakings jointly owned by those two railways, including the OA&GB.
The OA&GB was not affected by the grouping of 1923 remaining an independent joint line but now its lease was between the London, Midland and Scottish Railway and the London and North Eastern Railway. In 1948 OA&GB was nationalised and became part of British Railways.

The passenger service was withdrawn on 4 May 1959. At the same time a parcel concentration depot was being built on the goods yard site, it opened shortly after, goods services were withdrawn on 29 January 1968, except for a private siding at Oldham Clegg Street which closed in February 1970. The parcel depot closed in 1982 unable to compete with road traffic.

Accidents

23 October 1874
There was a collision between two trains at Canal Junction caused by a lack of the absolute block system, an absence of punctuality, a signal not working properly and one of the drivers not keeping a good enough look-out.

17 December 1874
There was a collision near  when "a train of passenger carriages without an engine under control of the guard at the rear of the train was being lowered from the up platform when they collided with some loaded coal wagons", two passengers were injured. The inspecting officer noted that traffic levels had outgrown the station capacity, the railway already had the necessary authority to remedy the situation and should do so.

5 April 1876
The rear two vehicles of the goods train were derailed when the passenger train ran into the back of it, five passengers were injured but no bones were broken nor lives lost. The inspecting officer concluded the lack of adequate braking, as the passenger train was not fitted with continuous brakes, and a lack of absolute block working were to blame.

21 August 1876
One of the trains was standing in the platform waiting for an engine when the second train was directed to the same platform and they collided, nine passengers were slightly injured.

3 February 1906
There was a collision between two trains at Crowthorne Junction when a passenger train ran into the back of goods train, twelve of the goods train wagons were derailed, ten passengers suffered injury one of which was serious.

References

Notes

Citations

Bibliography

 

 

Early British railway companies
British joint railway companies
Closed railway lines in North West England
Companies based in the Metropolitan Borough of Oldham
Railway companies established in 1857
Railway lines opened in 1861
1861 establishments in England
Manchester, Sheffield and Lincolnshire Railway
Woodhead Line
1857 establishments in England
Closed railway lines in Greater Manchester
British companies established in 1857